Čepure  is a village in the municipality of Paraćin, Serbia. According to the 2002 census, the village has a population of 825 people.

Notable residents
Predrag Marković (President of Serbia in 2004) was born in Čepure

References

Populated places in Pomoravlje District